Augusto Bergamino (12 July 1898 – 29 January 1976) was an Italian footballer who played as a forward.

Club career
Bergamino played for Genoa C.F.C. for 10 seasons.

International career
Bergamino made his debut for the Italy national football team on 18 January 1920 in a game against France.

Personal life
Bergamino's younger brother Giacomo Bergamino also played football professionally. To distinguish them, Augusto was referred to as Bergamino I and Giacomo as Bergamino II.

Honours
Genoa
 Champion of Italy: 1915, 1922–23, 1923–24.

External links
 

1898 births
1976 deaths
Italian footballers
Italy international footballers
Genoa C.F.C. players
Bologna F.C. 1909 players
Association football forwards
Asti Calcio F.C. players